Friedrich Holzapfel (July 20, 1900 – November 15, 1969) was a German politician of the Christian Democratic Union (CDU) and former member of the German Bundestag.

Life 
Holzapfel briefly belonged to the state parliament of North Rhine-Westphalia in 1946, was a member of the Zone Advisory Council of the British occupation zone from 1946 to 1948 and of the Economic Council of the Bizone from 1947 to 1949, where he was the parliamentary party chairman of the joint CDU, CSU and DP faction and of the ERP committee.

He belonged to the Bundestag as a directly elected member of parliament in the constituency of Höxter (then Warburg-Höxter-Büren) from the first election in 1949 until his resignation on 20 January 1953.

Literature

References

1900 births
1969 deaths
Members of the Bundestag for North Rhine-Westphalia
Members of the Bundestag 1949–1953
Members of the Bundestag for the Christian Democratic Union of Germany
Members of the Landtag of North Rhine-Westphalia